DXBL (95.7 FM), broadcasting as Mellow Touch 95.7, is a radio station owned and operated by FBS Radio Network. The station's studio and transmitter are located at the 3rd Floor, TS Midpoint Hub, Corrales Ave., Cagayan de Oro.

The station was an affiliate of Brigada News FM from 2012 to September 2014.

References

FBS Radio Network
Radio stations in Cagayan de Oro
Adult contemporary radio stations in the Philippines
Radio stations established in 1992